The 1920 Calgary municipal election was held on December 15, 1920 to a Mayor and six Aldermen to sit on Calgary City Council for two years, and two Aldermen to sit for one year. Additionally a Commissioner, three members for the Public School Board and two members for the Separate School Board were elected.

There were twelve aldermen on city council, but six of the positions were already filled: Frank Freeze, George Harry Webster, Annie Gale, and Fred Shouldice, were all elected to two-year terms in 1919 and were still in office. Both Samuel Hunter Adams and Issac G. Ruttle resigned their positions as Aldermen to run for mayor.

A number of plebiscites were held, all requiring a majority to pass.

The election was held under the Single Transferable Voting/Proportional Representation (STV/PR) with the term for Alderman being two years and the Mayor being one year.

Background
In the 1920 election for mayor, Adams ran against his only challenger, and fellow alderman Isaac G. Ruttle. Adams and Ruttle were both friends and agreed to spend only $100 during the election, $50 for advertisements in the Calgary Herald and $50 for advertisements in the Albertan. During the campaign both candidates would travel together as Adams did not have a car, and alternated who would speak first at each event. Eventually both candidates broke the agreement to spend only $100 with Ruttle placing advertisements between films in one of the City's theaters, and Adams countered with a $25 advertisement in the Market Examiner. Adams won the election held on December 15, 1920 with approximately 60% of the vote and assumed the role of Calgary's 21st Mayor on January 3, 1920, serving until January 2, 1923.

Results

Mayor

Council

Commissioner

Public School Board

Separate School Board

Plebiscites

Gas Plebiscite

Curfew Bylaw
To institute Curfew Law in Calgary.

Aldermen Pay
To pay Aldermen $500 per year.

Capitalize Street Railway Expenditures Bylaw
Vote on bylaw to capitalize $250,000 street railway expenditures.

Waterworks Extension Programme Bylaw
Vote on bylaw for waterworks extension programme.

See also
List of Calgary municipal elections

References

1920s in Calgary
Politics of Calgary
Municipal elections in Calgary
1920 elections in Canada